Mimoblennius cirrosus, the fringed blenny, is a species of combtooth blenny found in coral reefs in the western Indian Ocean.  This species grows to a length of  TL.

References

cirrosus
Fish described in 1971
Taxa named by Victor G. Springer